Veer-Zaara is a 2004 Indian Hindi-language romantic drama film directed by Yash Chopra, who co-produced it with his son Aditya Chopra. It stars Shah Rukh Khan and Preity Zinta as the eponymous star-crossed lovers: Veer Pratap Singh (Khan) is an Indian Air Force officer, and Zaara Hayaat Khan (Zinta) is the daughter of a Pakistani politician. Veer is imprisoned on false charges, and a young Pakistani lawyer, named Saamiya Siddiqui (Rani Mukerji), fights his case. Amitabh Bachchan, Hema Malini, Divya Dutta, Manoj Bajpayee, Boman Irani, Anupam Kher and Kirron Kher play supporting roles.

Chopra wanted to make his return to cinema after 7 years; he was dissatisfied with the scripts he received. Aditya then narrated a few scenes of a story he had written, which interested Chopra and prompted him to direct it. Chopra intended the film to be a tribute to Punjab; it was to be titled Yeh Kahaan Aa Gaye Hum, based on an eponymous song from Yash Chopra's Silsila (1981). Set in India and Pakistan, principal photography took place in Punjab and various locations in Mumbai; parts of the film were also shot in Pakistan. The soundtrack album, based on old compositions by Madan Mohan with lyrics by Javed Akhtar, was the highest-selling album of the year in India.

Veer-Zaara was released on 12 November 2004 during the Diwali festival. The film earned over 976.4 million worldwide, becoming the highest-grossing Indian film of the year in both India and overseas territories. It received widespread critical acclaim, with high praise directed to the story, screenplay, dialogues, soundtrack, performances and sensitive portrayal of India-Pakistan relations. It was described by analysts as having themes pertaining to a shared Punjabi culture, secularism and feminism, among others. The film is considered as one of the greatest romantic films of Indian film history.

At the 52nd National Film Awards, Veer-Zaara won the Best Popular Film Providing Wholesome Entertainment. At the 50th Filmfare Awards, the film received a leading 15 nominations, and won 4 awards, including Best Film and Best Story (Aditya Chopra). At the 6th IIFA Awards, it won a leading 7 awards of its 11 nominations, including Best Film, Best Director (Yash Chopra), Best Actor (Khan), Best Supporting Actress (Mukerji) and Best Music Director (Mohan).

Plot
In 2004, the Government of Pakistan decides to review unsolved cases pertaining to Indian prisoners as a goodwill gesture. Saamiya Siddiqui, a budding Pakistani lawyer, is given prisoner 786's defense as her first case. The prisoner has not spoken to anyone for 22 years. After addressing him by his name, Veer Pratap Singh, Veer opens up to Saamiya and narrates his story.

1982 – Zaara Hayaat Khan is a lively Pakistani woman whose family is of the political background and high standing in Lahore. Zaara's Sikh governess (whom she addresses as her grandmother) Bebe asks Zaara to scatter her ashes in the Sutlej river among her ancestors as her last wish. While traveling to India, Zaara's bus meets with an accident. Veer, an Indian Air Force pilot and a Punjabi Hindu, rescues her, and she completes Bebe's final rites. Veer convinces Zaara to return with him to his village to spend a day together on account of Lohri. Zaara meets Veer's uncle Choudhary Sumer Singh and his aunt Saraswati Kaur. Veer realises that he is falling in love with Zaara.

The next day, Veer takes Zaara to the train station for her train back to Lahore, planning to confess. However, he ends up meeting Zaara's fiancé Raza Sharazi. Before she leaves, he confesses his love to her, accepting that they cannot be together. Zaara boards in silence and bids him goodbye; both believe they will never meet again.

Back home in Pakistan, Zaara realises she too is in love with Veer but that she must keep her family's honour and marry Raza, a wedding that will further the political career of her father Jehangir. Seeing Zaara breaking down, her maid and friend Shabbo calls Veer, asking him to take Zaara away before her wedding. Veer quits the Indian Air Force and travels to Pakistan. When he arrives, Zaara runs into his arms in tears, causing her father to fall sick in shock. Mariyam begs Veer to leave Zaara because Jehangir's high-profile reputation and health will be too bad  if news gets out that Zaara is in love with an Indian. Veer respects this request and decides to leave but Raza, outraged by the shame Zaara has brought upon him, has him wrongly imprisoned under the name of Rajesh Rathore on charges of being an Indian spy. Meanwhile, the bus Veer was supposed to be on going back to India falls off a cliff, killing all the passengers. When Veer hears this in jail, he believes the amulet Zaara's mother gave him just protected his life.

Veer requests Saamiya not to mention either Zaara or her family whilst fighting the case, believing Zaara is happily married by now and he will only ruin her life. Due to this, Saamiya decides to cross the border and find someone in Veer's village who can prove his true identity. In Veer's village, she is shocked to meet Zaara and Shabbo instead. Zaara had thought that Veer died in the bus accident 22 years ago. After news of his death, she broke off the marriage with Raza, and her father agreed, getting them divorced himself. Afterward, Zaara and Shabbo left Pakistan and settled in Veer's village in India, so that Zaara could keep Veer's dream of running a girls' school alive. Saamiya takes Zaara back to Pakistan, and she shares an emotional reunion with Veer. Her statement and evidence prove Veer's innocence and his identity as Veer and not as Rajesh Rathore, and the judge frees him, apologising on behalf of Pakistan. Veer and Zaara, finally reunited, get married, say goodbye to Saamiya at the Wagah border crossing, and return to their village, living happily ever after.

Cast

 Shah Rukh Khan as Veer Pratap Singh
 Preity Zinta as Zaara Hayaat Khan
 Rani Mukerji as Saamiya Siddiqui, Veer's lawyer
 Amitabh Bachchan as Choudhary Sumer Singh, Veer's uncle
 Hema Malini as Saraswati Kaur, Veer's aunt
 Manoj Bajpayee as Raza Sharazi, Zaara's ex-husband
 Boman Irani as Jehangir Hayaat Khan, Zaara's father
 Kirron Kher as Mariyam Hayaat Khan, Zaara's mother
 Divya Dutta as Shabina "Shabbo" Ibrahim, Zaara's friend
 Anupam Kher as Zakir Ahmed, Saamiya's ex-mentor
 S. M. Zaheer as Pakistani Judge
 Akhilendra Mishra as Jailor 
 Zohra Sehgal as Zahida "Bebe" Hayaat Khan, Zaara's Grandmother
 Tom Alter as Doctor

Production

Development

Yash Chopra was due to return to directing after 7 years since Dil To Pagal Hai (1997). After his son Aditya completed filming for Mohabbatein (2000), they started to look for a new script for Chopra's return as a director. None of the new scripts excited Chopra; he expressed his disdain at the new trend of the films of the time, stating, "I was tired of television promos. All the semi-clad girls look the same." Chopra stated he was as nervous of his return as he was while directing his debut Dhool Ka Phool (1959). He then finalized another script and began casting for roles. Aditya then provided a narration of a few scenes of a new script, but conveyed that he would be unable to direct it. Chopra was interested and began to work on the new project.

According to Aditya, the story of Veer-Zaara was written as a medium for his father to return to his Punjabi roots. Chopra was born in Lahore, Punjab (present-day Pakistan) and later moved with his family to Jalandhar when he was young. He travelled to Bombay (present-day Mumbai) in 1951, when he was introduced to the film industry. Speaking about the film's theme, Chopra said, "Veer-Zaara is a humble tribute to my home in Punjab. It is my tribute to the oneness of people on both sides of the border." In preparation, Chopra watched videos of Pakistani marriages and consulted Nasreen Rehman, a professor of the Cambridge University for the film's portrayal of Pakistani culture, their courts and dialects.

While completing the film, Chopra and Aditya had a discussion about the film's title. Yeh Kahaan Aa Gaye Hum was one of the contenders for the title, but Veer-Zaara was ultimately chosen. Chopra said, "The film's lovers are not bothered with the strife around them. For them, love is the only religion." The title Veer-Zaara was initially hinted to mislead audiences. The film's titled was officially confirmed by Sanjeev Kohli, CEO of Yash Raj Films, who stated that the title was chosen after "much deliberation". Chopra stated that he used to have constant arguments with Aditya while filming Veer-Zaara.

Cast and crew

Shah Rukh Khan was cast in the lead role of Veer. Khan shortly played a 60-year-old man in the film, which he felt was a difficult role for him.

Zaara's role was first offered to Kajol, upon her rejection, the role went to Zinta. According to Chopra, Zinta was a person whose "looks and personality could be transformed." He wanted to break the Western stereotype characters played by Zinta. Zinta was interested in being a part of the film due to Chopra's finesse as a director. She also felt that it was time to move on from war-oriented films with Pakistan, saying, "I thought that was a great message to have in a film and I think what our governments can't do... what our government cannot do, our cinema can do and this film is truly doing that." Zinta had to attend various lessons for improving her diction for speaking Urdu. Though excited at first, she later "got knots in her stomach" worrying about her performance, but Chopra assured her.

Based on the Pakistani human rights activist Asma Jehangir, the role of Saamiya Siddiqui was initially offered to Aishwarya Rai Bachchan and Pakistani actress Nadia Jamil, but upon their refusal, it went to Rani Mukherji. Amitabh Bachchan and Hema Malini were cast as Veer's foster parents. Manoj Bajpayee was cast as Zaara's fiancé, a role which was originally offered to Ajay Devgn. In 2017, while promoting Aiyaary, Bajpayee revealed that Chopra used to often worry about the film's possible failure. Boman Irani was cast in the supporting role of Zaara's father. Real-life couple Anupam Kher and Kirron Kher appear in the film as Saamiya's mentor and Zaara's mother respectively, though they do not share the same frame. Other cast members included Divya Dutta, Zohra Sehgal, Akhilendra Mishra, and Tom Alter. Chopra denied the existence of a rivalry between the co-actors in the film, when asked about it in an interview with The Quint.

In addition to writing the story and screenplay, Aditya co-produced the film along with his father under the banner Yash Raj Films. The film's costumes were handled by Manish Malhotra. Khan's costumes were specifically designed by Karan Johar. Mandira Shukla was the film's costume designer. Anil Mehta, the cinematographer, was requested by Chopra to give the scenes a feel of olden times, in contrast with other films of the time like Kal Ho Naa Ho (2003). Sharmishta Roy, daughter of art director Sudhendu Roy, was chosen as the art director. Saroj Khan and Vaibhavi Merchant were the choreographers. Allan Amin was the action director.

Principal photography
In October 2004, Rediff.com published an exclusive "On The Sets" report for Veer-Zaara. The website reported that the cast members wore expensive costumes, one being Zinta, who wore a flurocent green lungi outfit; Khan was late for the shot. Parts of the film were shot in various locations in Mumbai. In 2004, the National Geographic reported that a folk festival sequence was being shot in Film City, Mumbai. An set that represented Punjab was created and Sikh dancers were brought in, whom, according to the report, look like peacocks due to their colorful turbans. All scenes which featured Khan in a prison were shot in a single day, at a jail in Pakistan. The court scenes were shot in a Pakistani law court.

While filming for an action sequence with Khan, Zinta had a near-fatal experience when she was hanging from a harness for nearly six hours. Zinta labeled it "one of the most humbling experiences of [her] life" and stated that it made her realize the difficulties male actors have to go through. For a sequence involving Khan's character calling Mukherji's character 'daughter', over 10 retakes were taken, and a pack-up was also announced by an "infuriated" Chopra, according to Khan. According to Mukherji, Chopra usually used to refrain from taking retakes as these would make the actors "mechanical".

Veer-Zaara was filmed entirely in sync sound. Khan stated that although he did not have to dub lines for the film separately, he did dub a few dialogues for the film. Saif Ali Khan's palace in Pataudi served as Zaara's mansion. A shoot was carried out in Punjab during a particular season, after which the indoor shooting was completed. Most of the filming was done in secrecy and no official announcements were made. Initially planned to be filmed over a period of 102 days, the film's filming was completed in 72 days. The film's reel length was 17757.61 ft (5412.52 m).

Analysis
In her book Violent Belongings: Partition, Gender and National Culture in Postcolonial India, Kavita Daiya, associate professor of English at the Columbian College of Arts and Sciences feels that Zaara represents secularism in Pakistan. She refers to the encounter between Zaara and Choudhary Sumer Singh, where Zaara persuades Singh to promote women's education as an instance of the theme. Daiya notes that no person faces animosity by being either Indian or Pakistani in the film. Meenakshi Bharat and Nirmal Kumar, authors of the book Filming the Line of Control: The Indo–Pak Relationship through the Cinematic Lens, concur with Daiya and feels this shows maturity on Chopra's part, who ignores the issue of Jammu and Kashmir and was able to "overcome the phobia of Pakistan" usually present in Indian films. They compare it to Chopra's earlier films, where "hate-filled encounters" are generally avoided. Philip Lutgendorf agrees and also notes the influence of Sufi tradition, where Veer's ultimate reward is union with Allah, much like a Sufi pir. Kush Varia, author of the book Bollywood: Gods, Glamour, and Gossip, whilst agreeing with Bharat and Kumar about Chopra, notes that the lovers are reunited as compared to Chopra's earlier romances, where they remain separated.

Daiya establishes that Veer's "Indian masculinity" is shown through his sacrifice of spending 22 years in jail. Nandini Bhattacharya, author of the book Hindi Cinema: Repeating the Subject, differs and instead feels that Veer's character is "partially feminized""men are meant to be captors, not captives." Sangita Gopal, associate professor of English at the University of Oregon and author of the book Conjugations: Marriage and Form in New Bollywood Cinema, notes that Veer's identity dies after 22 years and even after reuniting with Zaara, they are too old to reproduce. She perceives this as the transition from "living death to fruitless life". Daiya feels that the Punjabi village in Veer-Zaara acts as a model for India, and Zaara's positive to a song describing India, feeling similarities with Pakistan, exposes an incomplete "utopian" affiliation between the two lovers. Daiya further feels that Veer's poem challenges the differences between the nations of India and Pakistan and establishes resemblance between the nations and citizens. Varia too agrees that the shared heritage of the Punjabis is one of the film's themes, explored in the song "Aisa Des Hai Mera".

Bharat and Kumar feel that Veer-Zaara and Main Hoon Na (2004), also starring Khan, accepts Pakistan's status as a separate entity from India. Rajinder Dudrah, senior lecturer at the University of Manchester, contrasts Veer-Zaara with Main Hoon Na, writing that while the former "explores the pleasures and trials of border crossing", the latter "extols the virtues of overcoming the border through diplomacy and personal actions." He notes that they show different depictions of borders that the protagonists need to overcome. He feels that the central aestic pleasures of the films, especially Veer-Zaara, is the emphasis on border crossing as a "potentially radical act". Bharat and Kumar also compare Henna (1991) with Veer-Zaara; they say that the "urbane, educated, professional characters" of Veer-Zaara replace Henna's village people referring to "religion straight from the heart" and "responding to [Pakistan] in an unencumbered manner." Henna's brother died in helping Chander across the border; this is contrasted with Saamiya helping Veer in court. Dudrah notes that the ease with which the protagonists move across borders without going through legal procedurings could be a source of criticism.

Gopal feels that the film's dual time and use of old music was the reason for its appeal to masses and its commercial success. She compares the last segment of the title song in which Zaara is shot to the climax of Mani Ratnam's Dil Se.. (1998); both films suggest that the lovers cannot be united. She also feels that the extended ending with the song "Tere Liye" was for a realistic approach. In her book Dreaming in Canadian: South Asian Youth, Bollywood, and Belonging, Faiza Hirji feels that cultural and religious differences were not acknowledged in the film, while noting Pakistani and Muslim traditions were highlighted. She felt that the universality of the maternal habit was highlighted in a sequence between Zaara's mother and Veer. She contrasts the love to Bombay (1995), where religion is an obstacle to love, which is not the case in Veer-Zaara. Comparing the film with Gadar: Ek Prem Katha (2001), Rini Bhattacharya Mehta and Rajeshwari V. Pandharipande (authors of the book Bollywood and Globalization: Indian Popular Cinema, Nation, and Diaspora) state that while Veer-Zaara manipulates the state's critique to make it appear "progressive" at first glance, Gadar does not. Both Gadar and Veer-Zaara feature a double recovery; only that the latter adopts "similarly duplicitous modes of writing political structures as individual destined whose triumph over nation-state politics drives aground more completely any redemptive plot of neighborly understanding". Bhattacharya agrees and also equates it with Gadar and others like Mother India (1957), where the "identity of the normative citizen" is established.

Soundtrack

Veer-Zaaras soundtrack features 11 songs with music based on old and untouched compositions by the late Madan Mohan, as revised by his son Sanjeev Kohli. The vocals are provided by Lata Mangeshkar, Jagjit Singh, Udit Narayan, Sonu Nigam, Gurdas Mann, Roop Kumar Rathod, Ahmed and Mohammed Hussain and Pritha Mazumder. The lyrics were written by Javed Akhtar. Kohli found Mohan's unused recordings in his cupboard shortly after his death, which was then used for Veer-Zaara upon Chopra's insistence. Mangeshkar used to sing with Madan Mohan; according to Chopra, upon coming for the recording, with tears in her eyes, Lata Mangeshkar told him, "Madan Mohan was like my brother. You [Chopra] are like my brother. I feel I have gone back in the past". The soundtrack of Veer-Zaara was released on CD, LP record and on Audio DVD. Yash Raj Music also released complete background music of Veer-Zaara titled "The Love Legend Themes – Instrumental". After the soundtrack release, Chopra did not allow radio-stations to air its songs to generate curiosity.

In a soundtrack review, Syed Firdaus Ashraf of Rediff.com states, "It will disappoint you at first, but if you listen to it repeatedly, the music will grow on you." Ashraf felt that "Kyon Hawa", sung by Sonu Nigam, was the best song in the album. Derek Elley of Variety agrees with Ashraf on the first point, writing, "While not instantly hummable, they do the job effectively." In a review of "Tere Liye", a Sify editor writes, "Madan Mohan's mastery with tunes is quite apparent in this number, parts of which are used often in the movie." Joginder Tuteja of Bollywood Hungama rated it 4 stars out of 5, writing, "Veer-Zaara is a mixed bag varying from a rich collection of love songs to emotional tracks to a patriotic number, a qawwali, a folk song and a ghazal. While the first half of the album is instantly appealing the second half will slowly grow on you." A reviewer for the BBC applauded the album, calling it "unique and special".

Mohan was nominated for the Best Music Director at the 50th Filmfare Awards, and won the Best Music Director at the 6th IIFA Awards. Akhtar got nominated for the Best Lyricist at the 50th Filmfare Awards for "Aisa Des Hai Mera", "Main Yahaan Hoon" and "Tere Liye", winning for "Tere Liye"; he also received a nomination for the IIFA Award for Best Lyricist for "Tere Liye". It was the highest-selling music album of the year in India, with sales of around 3 million units.

Release
Veer-Zaara was released on 12 November 2004 and promoted with the tagline, "A Love Legend". A special screening was conducted in Punjab, Pakistan for Pakistani audiences. Apart from that, it was screened at the Berlin Film Festival, where it received high critical acclaim. On 26 April 2006, Veer-Zaara had its French premiere at The Grand Rex, the biggest theatre in Paris. It is the first Hindi film to premiere in such a large and luxe venue. It was released in 60 prints in the United Kingdom, and in the United States in 88 prints. In 2017, Veer-Zaara was restrained at the Best of Bollywood series in the United States.

On 6 June 2005, Yash Raj Films released the DVD of Veer-Zaara. The film was released on Blu-ray in December 2009. In September 2007, a book based on the making of the film, titled They Said It... The Memoirs of a Love Legend Yash Chopra's Veer-Zaara, was released. The book contains testimonials from members of the film's cast and crew and follows the production stages of the film.

Critical response

India
Veer-Zaara was highly acclaimed by critics, who praised the film's story, screenplay, dialogues, music, performances and sensitive portrayal of India-Pakistan relations.

Taran Adarsh of Bollywood Hungama gave it 4.5 stars out of five and comments, "There's romance, there's a strong dose of emotions, there're songs aplenty, there's drama... But, most important, it has soul, which has been lacking in most movies of late". Writing for India Today, Kaveree Bamzai gave a positive review and compliments Khan's performance, writing, "Khan strides across Aditya Chopra's screenplay with assured ease." Subhash K. Jha gave Veer-Zaara a positive review for Indo-Asian News Service, praising the performances of the leads as "old yet passionate, frail yet sublime" and writes, "The surge of love between two people belonging to entirely different cultures and lands is collected into a quaint and quivering collage of memory and melody."

Jitesh Pillai of The Times of India rates it 3.5 stars out of five, crediting Aditya's writing and its execution. He writes, "Yash Chopra's Veer-Zaara may be woefully long and meandering. But... this one works and grabs us where it matters. VZ is one from the heart." Also writing for Times of India, Nishtha Bhatnagar called it a "must-watch". Deepu Madhavan of NDTV praised the execution of the plot and writes, "the love story of Squadron Leader Veer Pratap Singh and Zaara Hayaat Khan is an ode to ageless romance and timeless love." Avijit Ghosh gave the film 7/10 in The Telegraph and writes, "The film works because the stars shine. Preity's Zaara is both restrained and dignified. This is her most nuanced performance to date." He criticized the film's length and excessive use of Punjabi, but finally writes, "We have an honest-to-the-heart film that remarkably bypasses the bitterness of Indo-Pak relations in a cross-border love story... Veer-Zaara is for all seasons and every reason." Namrata Joshi of Outlook described it as "a good-hearted film wherein the underlying theme is the all-embracing goodness of 'people'."

Chitra Mahesh of The Hindu writes, "Veer-Zaara is inordinately long and sentimental. Certain things like fabulous camera work, art direction, and sensuousness of the moods, are a given. And you would overlook the cliches simply because there are such good performances, especially from Zinta and Mukherji," while also appreciating that Khan "looks good and performs most creditably." Sukanya Varma of Rediff.com criticizes Chopra for repeating content from his previous films, while appreciating the performances and finally writes, "if you are a fan of the Chopra factory of filmmaking and looking for plenty of eye-candy, Veer-Zaara promises to make your Diwali a happy one." In another review for The Times of India, Teena Malik heavily criticized it in agreement with Verma for repetition of content, and labelled the film "horrifying".

Overseas
 On Metacritic, which assigns a weighted average to films, it has a score of 67 based on five critics, indicating "generally favorable reviews". The film featured in the British Film Institute's list of 10 Great Bollywood Romances, with commentary by Rachel Dwyer. Dwyer feels that the film represents the "much-shared culture and history" of the Punjab. She writes, "Their dramatization in the film shows Chopra’s skill with film and music."

Anita Gates of New York Times writes that Veer-Zaara "would be embraced as fabulously trashy" had it been an American film but credits the cultural impact, writing, "the cultural assumptions of Veer and Zaara add a welcome element of freshness for American audiences. When Zaara's mother reminds her daughter that women always love fully, with heart and soul, she casually adds, "Men don't have the strength to love like that." Derek Elley of Variety observes that while it does not have "technique and production sheen" as recent Hindi films, Veer-Zaaras "in-depth star casting and thorough entertainment values" make it a "must-see" for Indian filmgoers. Maitland McDonagh of TV Guide wrote, "Though Chopra's film is emotionally extravagant even by the standards of India's epically unrestrained cinema, the star-crossed lovers bear the weighty metaphorical significance of their travails surprisingly lightly, particularly Zinta's radiantly lovely Zaara." Jonathan Curiel of San Francisco Chronicle was particularly fond of the film, finding the movie experience "so arresting, its scenes so full of beauty and colors, that the three hours go by almost too fast". He further noted that unlike other Hindi films, it deserves a wider audience for portraying "the humanity in characters who represent 'the other'", done "in a way that's dramatic, funny, fun, silly, musical, stylish, romantic and redemptive".

Carrie R. Wheadon of Common Sense Media gives it four stars out of five and rates it as 11+, writing, "Those who watch can't miss the pleas for understanding and peace between India and Pakistan or the film's strong support of equality for women." She compliments the picturization of the songs, opening, "Even the slower love songs will hold viewers, especially as Zaara dreams about seeing Veer everywhere while she prepares for her wedding." Manish Gajjar of BBC commented, "Veer-Zaara has a great storyline with some unpredictable twists and emotions, keeping you engrossed throughout."

Box office
Veer-Zaara was commercially successful at the box office. Prior to the film's release, Adarsh predicted that the film would be a commercial success. It was released in 625 screens in India and grossed  24.6 million nett on its opening day, the year's second highest-opening for a film in India. Veer-Zaara topped the week's highest-grossing films in India in the first week, grossing an average of  6,85,948 per print. It earned  175.7 million nett in its first week, the highest first week collection of an Indian film. Since its release, it topped the weekly charts 39 times in India. It also had the highest weekend collection of the year, earning  97.8 million over the weekend. The film remained at the first position in its second week of release, grossing an average of  1,89,502 per print. At the end of its theatrical run, it collected  580 million in India, becoming the highest-grossing film of the year.

The film earned  357 million in the overseas markets 152.5 million from the United Kingdom,  140 million from the United States and  65 million from other territoriesmaking it 2004's highest-grossing Indian production overseas. In its first week in the United Kingdom, the film collected $900,000, for the fourth position on the local box office chart. The film collected the same amount in North America, 15th on the local box office chart. The film was a blockbuster, with regard to its overseas collection. Veer-Zaara grossed a total of  worldwide, becoming the highest grossing Indian film of the year.

See also
 List of accolades received by Veer-Zaara

References

External links
 
 
 Veer-Zaara's Official Site

2004 films
2000s Hindi-language films
Indian interfaith romance films
Films set in Punjab, India
Films set in Lahore
Films directed by Yash Chopra
2004 romantic drama films
Indian romantic musical films
India–Pakistan relations in popular culture
Yash Raj Films films
Indian Air Force in films
Indian courtroom films
Best Popular Film Providing Wholesome Entertainment National Film Award winners